Romualdius is a genus of snout and bark beetles in the family Curculionidae. There are a dozen described species in Romualdius.  The genus was raised by Roman Borovec in 2009 for a group of species formerly assigned to Trachyphloeus, and is named after the eminent Czech entomologist Romuald Formánek (1857-1927).

Species

References

Curculionidae
Curculionidae genera